Phragmipedium chapadense is a species of orchid endemic to the Brazilian state Goiás and in a range between Costa Rica and Ecuador.

References

External links 

chapadense
Endemic orchids of Brazil
Flora of Goiás